This list is intended to help identify a particular early form of lattice girder bridge which was popular with bridge engineers particularly in the United Kingdom in the latter half of the 19th century.

The term "lattice girder", is used in the UK and "lattice truss" is more widely used in the USA. A lattice girder or truss is often defined only in two dimensions, that is (in the case of a bridge) the structure as seen from the side. Such definitions sufficed for the early lattice girders such as the US Town truss which was designed for construction in timber. Early iron structures using a Town-type lattice replicated this appearance, leading to the instantly recognisable lattice-work shown in the bridges in Part A of this list. However, design considerations required that an iron (as opposed to a wooden) structure required many of the latticed bars to be stiffened in the third dimension. Thus, on closer examination, the delicate appearance of these early iron lattices is belied by this much more complex stiffening in the thickness or third dimension. This complex stiffening is itself also sometimes described as a ‘lattice girder’, being composed of (typically) two or four parallel flat or angled steel bars, closely spaced but linked by lattice work. Such a member is better described as a "laced strut", and such members frequently form a significant part of a lattice girder. The use of laced struts within a lattice girder can be seen in the two photographs of the c1860s lattice girder bridge at Llandeilo.

The first table lists these early examples. (Note that some bridges, for example the New Clyde Viaduct (or Second Caledonian Bridge) in Glasgow, appear to be of lattice construction whereas in fact the latticing is used solely for the protective parapet.)

In later forms, various developments took place: for example, the lattice became less dense and each individual diagonal thus much more substantial; vertical members were introduced; and eventually both diagonal and vertical members achieved cross-sectional dimensions comparable to those of the main top and bottom components, thus forming what is more commonly known as a truss.

The second table lists these later developments.

Bridges with dense latticing constructed from flat iron bars or angles

Bridges with simpler use of diagonal and vertical members

See also
List of railway bridges and viaducts in the United Kingdom

References

Bridges in the United Kingdom
Bridges
Lat